Not as a Stranger is a 1955 American film noir drama film produced and directed by Stanley Kramer, starring Olivia de Havilland, Robert Mitchum, Frank Sinatra and Gloria Grahame. It is based on the 1954 novel of the same name by Morton Thompson, which topped that year's list of bestselling novels in the United States. The film's supporting cast features Broderick Crawford, Charles Bickford, Lon Chaney Jr., Lee Marvin, Harry Morgan and Mae Clarke.

Plot
Lucas Marsh is a brilliant and dedicated medical student who has aspired to be a doctor since childhood. His mother is dead and he is estranged from his alcoholic father, who has squandered the family's money, leaving Lucas unable to pay for medical school. In order to get the needed tuition money, Lucas marries older nurse Kristina "Kris" Hedvigson, who has substantial savings. Although Kris loves Lucas and helps him in a variety of ways, he is indifferent toward her and considers her "stupid" although she is an excellent nurse. Lucas cares only about his medical work and frequently clashes with other doctors whom he considers incompetent, including his wealthy best friend Alfred Boone. Kris, Alfred, and Lucas' mentor Dr. Aarons try to humanize him and teach him that all doctors sometimes make mistakes.

Lucas looks down on doctors who focus on making money, and after completing his internship, he accepts a position working with Dr. Dave Runkleman in his busy practice in rural Greenville, where many patients lack the money to pay. Runkleman, who has a life-threatening heart condition, hired Lucas to help with the workload and perhaps take over the practice. Overworked and frustrated with the incompetent head of the local hospital, Lucas has an affair with rich widow Harriet Lang, causing Kris, who is secretly pregnant, to finally leave him. When Runkleman's heart condition flares up, Lucas performs surgery to save his life, but makes a mistake during the surgery and Runkleman dies. Struggling to cope with his failure, Lucas begs Kris to help him, and the two reconcile.

Cast

 Olivia de Havilland as Kristina Hedvigson
 Robert Mitchum as Dr. Lucas Marsh
 Frank Sinatra as Dr. Alfred Boone
 Gloria Grahame as Harriet Lang
 Broderick Crawford as Dr. Aarons
 Charles Bickford as Dr. Dave W. Runkleman
 Myron McCormick as Dr. Clem Snider
 Lon Chaney Jr. as Job Marsh
 Jesse White as Ben Cosgrove
 Harry Morgan as Oley
 Lee Marvin as Brundage
 Virginia Christine as Bruni
 Eve McVeagh as Mrs Ferris
 Mae Clarke as Nurse Odell
 Whit Bissell as Dr. Dietrich
 Nancy Culp as Greenville patient (uncredited)
 Robert Bailey as patient Charlie (uncredited)
 Gertrude Hoffman as Mrs. Payton (uncredited)

Production
The picture was Stanley Kramer's first time directing a theatrical film.

Reception
In a contemporary review for The New York Times, critic Bosley Crowther panned the film, including Kramer's directing and Mitchum's acting: "The delineator of this exegesis is a stolid young medical man whose personality and fierce determination should make a feature-length study in themselves. And the fact that Mr. Kramer has not managed to force a clear understanding of his man is quite as much a shortcoming of the picture as is the flat performance of Robert Mitchum in the role. ... With so much dissecting in his picture—and so much of it being good—it is too bad that Mr. Kramer couldn't have done a little on his characters."

The Philadelphia Inquirer, citing the huge sales of the source novel, thought the film having “perhaps the largest ready-made audience since ‘Gone With the Wind,” though “Whether this audience will be satisfied with the compressed, considerably altered version Kramer has given them remains to be seen….a disturbing lack of courage in the script which treads timidly in dealing with the seamier side of medicine…badly miscast in its two key roles….Mitchum is, bluntly, a shattering disappointment….Expressionless, ill at ease, Mitchum moves stolidly through a series of episodes which should certainly have revealed him as more than a robot. Equally at sea is Olivia de Havilland, bleached and with a Swedish accent that comes and goes….she even, following her husband’s infidelity, orders Luke from the house, a thing Thompson’s devoted doormat of a woman would never have dreamed of doing….far better than the stars are Charles Bickford…and Broderick Crawford….Lon Chaney is grotesque as Luke’s alcoholic father; Gloria Grahame a conventional movie siren…and Myron McCormick far too pleasant as the unethical, incompetent head of Greenville’s mismanaged hospital.”

The Citizen-News praised the film's authenticity: "There is a fine ring of authenticity to every scene involving the story's medical aspects, and the fast 'shock' clip showing the beating heart of a patient takes you, scalpel in hand, into the surgical center of the hospital." However, the paper's review was critical of the acting and casting: "... Bickford's acting was the one bright spot in a set of standard performances. ... [T]he principal roles were miscast, with the exception of Bickford and Miss Graham."

The Los Angeles Times described the film's premiere at the Stanley-Warner Beverly Hills Theatre as "... truly festive ... with an especially large street crowd, and a mood of celebration that was all prevailing." The newspaper's critic Edwin Schallert praised the film, calling it "... one of the strongest dramatic pictures exhibited to the public thus far this year."

Release
Not as a Stranger earned a worldwide distribution gross of over $8 million, and a profit of $1.8 million. It was United Artists' highest-grossing film at the time.

The film was released on Blu-ray disc by Kino Lorber in 2018.

Awards
Not as a Stranger was nominated for an Academy Award for Best Sound Recording (Watson Jones). Frank Sinatra was nominated for a BAFTA Award for Best Foreign Actor, and Charles Bickford won the National Board of Review award for Best Supporting Actor.

See also
 List of American films of 1955

References

External links
 
 
 
 

1954 American novels
American novels adapted into films
Medical novels
1955 films
1955 romantic drama films
American romantic drama films
American black-and-white films
1950s English-language films
Films scored by George Antheil
Films based on American novels
Films directed by Stanley Kramer
Films produced by Stanley Kramer
Medical-themed films
United Artists films
Films with screenplays by Edward Anhalt
Film noir
Films with screenplays by Edna Anhalt
Films about physicians
1955 directorial debut films
1950s American films